Radio Nova is a non-commercially run student radio situated and broadcasting in Oslo, Norway, at FM 99.3. The radio is run by a team of volunteer journalists and technicians.

The station went on-air for the first time on 16 March 1982, as Norway's first non-Christian, local radio station.

, the station broadcasts 60 hours a week between 40 programs. In the course of a week there is a range of different programmes; debates, programs that deal with film, the sciences, literature, music, culture and social questions.

Together with the rest of Norway's student radio stations, Radio Nova introduced a shared endeavor to further the cause of independent/alternative music: a national student radio play-list. The student stations in the three biggest university towns (Oslo, Bergen, and Trondheim) have in cooperation put together the list, but with the expectation it will be played by smaller student stations throughout the country.

External links
Official website

References

Radio stations in Norway
Radio stations established in 1982
1982 establishments in Norway
Campus, college, student and university radio stations
Mass media in Oslo
Music in Oslo